Ormopterum is a genus of flowering plants belonging to the family Apiaceae.

Its native range is Turkemenistan to Pakistan.

Species:

Ormopterum tuberosum 
Ormopterum turcomanicum

References

Apioideae
Apioideae genera